Wilmington is an unincorporated community in Fluvanna County, in the U.S. state of Virginia.

References

Unincorporated communities in Virginia
Unincorporated communities in Fluvanna County, Virginia